Chamba Assembly constituency is one of the 68 constituencies in the Himachal Pradesh Legislative Assembly of Himachal Pradesh a northern state of India. Chamba is also part of Kangra Lok Sabha constituency.

Members of Legislative Assembly

Election Results

2022

2017

See also
 Chamba district
 Kangra district
 List of constituencies of Himachal Pradesh Legislative Assembly

References

External links
 

Assembly constituencies of Himachal Pradesh
Chamba district